Daniela Hantuchová was the defending champion, but chose not to participate that year.

Ana Ivanovic won the title, defeating Vera Zvonareva in the final 6–2, 6–1.

Seeds
The top four seeds receive a bye into the second round.

Draw

Finals

Top half

Bottom half

External links
Draw and Qualifying Draw

Generali Ladies Linz